Nik & Jay is the self-titled, first studio album by the Danish Pop duo Nik & Jay.

Track listing
"Det vi gør" - 2:30
"Hot!" – 3:12
"Elsker hende mere" – 3:44
"Ryst din røv" – 3:21
"Nik & Jay" – 3:42
"Tch-Tching" – 4:04
"Tag mig tilbage" – 4:52
"Gå for det" – 3:07
"Lær mig at elske dig" – 4:49
"Freaky" – 3:39
"Pige (er du fri i nat?)" – 3:47

Charts
The album reached #2 in the Danish Albums Chart

Singles
Four singles were released from the album: "Nik & Jay" was the debut single of the duo that reached #3 in the Danish Singles Chart in 2002. This was followed by "Hot" also in 2002, as well as "Elsker hende mere" and "Ta' mig tilbage" in 2003.

2003 albums
Nik & Jay albums